is a female Japanese manga artist. She graduated from Ritsumeikan University with a degree in Japanese literature. She is famous for portraying Chinese and Korean history in her works. She currently lives in Kyoto.

Works

Manga 
 
 
 
 
 
 
 
 
 
 
 , story by Hiroshi Mori
 
 , story by Koike Kazuo
Mitsubachi to Enrai (蜜蜂と遠雷)

Games 
 , character design
 , character concept design

Novel illustrations

Illustration Collection

External links
  Natsuki Sumeragi's official site
 A brief introduction at MangaArt

1967 births
Living people
Japanese illustrators
Manga artists